Maciej Wroblewski competed for Poland in the men's standing volleyball events at the 1988 Summer Paralympics (bronze medal) and the 1992 Summer Paralympics (silver medal).

See also 
 Poland at the 1988 Summer Paralympics
 Poland at the 1992 Summer Paralympics

References 

Living people
Year of birth missing (living people)
Place of birth missing (living people)
Polish men's volleyball players
Paralympic silver medalists for Poland
Paralympic bronze medalists for Poland
Paralympic medalists in volleyball
Volleyball players at the 1988 Summer Paralympics
Volleyball players at the 1992 Summer Paralympics
Medalists at the 1988 Summer Paralympics
Medalists at the 1992 Summer Paralympics
21st-century Polish people
20th-century Polish people
Paralympic volleyball players of Poland